This is a list of 110 species in the genus Dysmicoccus.

Dysmicoccus species

References

Dysmicoccus